Cabra  is an inner suburb on the northside of Dublin city in Ireland. It was commonly known as Cabragh until the early 20th century. Largely located between the Royal Canal and the Phoenix Park, it is primarily a residential suburb, with a range of institutions and some light industry. Cabra is served by bus, tram and mainline rail; it lies across Navan Road, one of the main roads from central Dublin to the orbital motorway.

History

From about 1480, the manor of Cabra was held by a branch of the Plunket family, another branch of which was later ennobled as Earls of Fingall. The branch which held Cabragh had its main residence at Dunsoghly Castle near Finglas, which still exists.

There are three contiguous townlands called "Cabra", each in a different civil parish: Grangegorman, Glasnevin and Castleknock. The three met at the gate lodge of Cabragh House, today the location of the roundabout at the meeting of Ratoath Road and Fassaugh Avenue and the Canon Burke Senior Citizens Flats complex. Completed in 1598, Cabragh House was first occupied by the Segrave family. The mansion was then the home of the "hanging judge" Lord Norbury until he died in 1831 and the Segrave family managed to reacquire it. Charles Segrave, whose son was the famous racing driver Henry Segrave lived there until 1912. The big house was bought by Dublin Corporation by way of a compulsory purchase order in 1939 for the construction of local authority housing, and the historic house was razed to the ground.

The Industrial Revolution brought the construction of the Royal Canal in 1790 and the laying of one railway line (a Great Southern and Western branch), both through the northern part of the area, while another railway line (the Great Western from Broadstone Terminus) ran through the heart of the area. The Great Southern and Western branch line even had a sideline for the North City Mills on the border of Cabra and Phibsboro. Due to the proximity of Broadstone, there were no local railway stations, the nearest being beyond Phibsboro, Glasnevin Station northeast of Cross Guns (then Westmoreland) Bridge.

From about 1880 to 1930, Cabra was a prominent market garden centre and a giant lairage, where cattle being brought to market at Hanlon's Corner were kept in pens and grazing fields; there was a set of cattle sidings on the GW&W Railway line to the east of Carnlough Road. Until the 1920s, when large-scale housing developments took place, the area mostly comprised fields and open countryside on the edge of the city. Many of the people who moved to the new suburb were from the city centre slums.

Quarry Road was originally called Quarry Lane, after a small quarry which was situated near where the current statue of Our Blessed Lady is located at the roundabout with Fassaugh Road (originally Fassaugh Lane.) This quarry was filled in the early part of the 1900s and the family who lived in the Homestead grew cabbages on the reclaimed land.

Geography
Cabra is located southwest of the Royal Canal, except for one small piece of land between the canal and railway line, and northeast of the Phoenix Park, and runs southeast to northwest, from Phibsboro at St. Peter's Church and around the sixth Royal Canal lock, and Grangegorman at Hanlon's Corner, to Ashtown and Pelletstown; across the canal are the districts of first Glasnevin and then Finglas. The area is often divided into Cabra East and Cabra West, with a notional line of division being the railway line coming from the Phoenix Park Tunnel and going to Connolly Station.

The Bradogue River, a tributary of the Liffey, rises underground at the southern edge of the district.

Transport and access

Dublin Bus
Dublin Bus' two main routes for the area are the 120 Ashtown via Cabra West/East to Parnell Street/Ballsbridge and 122 Ashington, Cabra West/East, City to Drimnagh. Routes 38/a/b serve Cabra Road, while 37, 39, 39a,70, 70N serve Navan Road. Route 46A travels the North Circular Road, part of Cabra's southern boundary.

Luas

The Luas Green Line, part of Dublin's tram system, has been extended to a terminus at Broombridge railway station, with another local Luas stop deep in the area, Cabra, and also nearby Phibsborough, Grangegorman and Broadstone-DIT – the last two serving the new TU Dublin (formerly Dublin Institute of Technology) campus at Grangegorman.

Mainline rail
Suburban rail stops at Broombridge and Pelletstown stations, en route to Maynooth railway station, M3 Parkway railway station or stations in Dublin city centre such as Docklands railway station or Dublin Connolly railway station.

Amenities 
 
Mount Bernard Park is a Dublin City Council Park located in Cabra. The main entrance to Mount Bernard Park is located at Liam Whelan Bridge, Connaught Street with another entrance at Shandon Park. The park has footpaths for walkers and sports facilities including tennis courts, a basketball court, a 5-a-side football pitch and a playground. Naomh Fionnbarra GAA Club is located in Cabra. The Royal Canal runs through Cabra and provides a green amenity to residents for walking and cycling

Features

Broom Bridge

Broom Bridge, also known as Brougham Bridge, is a small bridge along Broombridge Road which crosses the Royal Canal in Cabra. The bridge is named after William Broom, one of the directors of the Royal Canal Company. Broom Bridge is the location where Sir William Rowan Hamilton, following a 'eureka experience', first wrote down the fundamental formula for quaternions on 16 October 1843, which is to this day commemorated by a stone plaque on the northwest corner of the underside of the bridge. The text on the plaque reads:

Given the historical importance of the mathematical contribution, mathematicians have been known to make a pilgrimage of sorts to the site.

Other buildings
Dublin city's public libraries have one of their administrative centres in the area, attached to Cabra Library – this Bibliographic Centre processes all books received and dispatches them to all branch libraries.

Deaf Village Ireland, formerly the School and Home for the Deaf, is located in a parkland setting in southern Cabra West. This facility is home to a range of Deaf organisations, including Deaf Sports Ireland.

Along the canal towards Liffey Junction, and serving the railway, was once a coke-making site, of which only some of the Coke Oven Cottages, formerly lying north and south of the canal, remain. Near the Sixth Lock was a pin mill on the site now occupied by 25–36 Shandon Mill (closer to the Fifth Lock and Cross Guns Bridge was a corn mill, at another time Mallet's Ironworks).

Education

Cabra contains several primary and second-level schools.

St. Declan's College is an all-boys secondary school located in Cabra West, originally set up by The Christian Brothers. It is a public school under Christian management and opened in 1960. Also in the area are the all-girls school St. Dominic's College and the mixed Gaelcholáiste Coláiste Mhuire. Coláiste Éanna Cabra Technical School opened in 1945 and changed its name to Cabra Community College in 2018. St. Joseph's School for Deaf Boys and St. Mary's School for Deaf Girls, merged to form the Holy Family School for the Deaf and Casa Caterina, a school for children with ADD, Asperger's syndrome and similar conditions, are also situated in the area.

Commerce
Cabra West is home to a number of factories, both in the industrial park and along Bannow Road. One such factory is the Batchelors beans factory.

Religion
Cabra is a parish in the Fingal South West deanery of the Roman Catholic Archdiocese of Dublin.

The Roman Catholic Church of Christ the King was opened in 1933 in the wake of the Eucharistic Congress of Dublin (1932). John J. Robinson of Robinson and Keefe was asked to design the new church, as he had been the architect for all the structures (Phoenix Park, Merrion Road, O'Connell bridge etc.) built for the Congress. The church is cross-shaped in plan and was built in red brick with a huge statue of Christ integrated into the tower, which is on the axis of the approach road. The church shares a number of features with St. Therese Mount Merrion which was designed by the same architect approximately 20 years later. Robinson was also the architect of Galway Cathedral.

Local organisations
The Order of Malta Ambulance Corps has a branch in the area, and has provided training in first-aid and nursing skills, and voluntary community care services for over 30 years. The related national youth organisation, the Order of Malta Cadets, is for 10- to 16-year-olds.

The FÁS training centre, present in Cabra since 1978, was closed down on 24 December 2010. Courses, staff and instructors were sent to other training centres in the city. One of the apprenticeship courses, Construction Plant Fitting, has since been moved to a temporary home in Baldoyle, near the FÁS Baldoyle Training Centre.

Notable persons
Notable people from Cabra include singer-songwriter Eleanor McEvoy, world champion boxer Steve Collins, author and journalist Gene Kerrigan, actors Michael Gambon and Frank Grimes, actress and singer Angeline Ball, singer Dickie Rock, rapper Kojaque and multi-time WWE world champion Sheamus (real name Stephen Farrelly).

Numerous footballers hail from Cabra, including Republic of Ireland international goalkeeper Wayne Henderson, and Éamonn Fagan and Liam Whelan, both from St. Attracta Road. Whelan was one of the Manchester United Busby Babes who died in the Munich air disaster of 1958, and Connaught Bridge was later renamed in his memory. The former Leeds United and Irish player and manager Johnny Giles also hails from the area. Roddy Collins, former manager of Bohemians, Shamrock Rovers and Maltese side Floriana, lived in Cabra before being appointed manager of Cork City.

The suburb's most infamous former resident was John Toler, 1st Earl of Norbury, otherwise known as the hanging judge, who lived at Cabragh House on the corner of the present-day Fassaugh Avenue and Ratoath Road. Another judge, with a far less villainous reputation who also lived in Cabra, was Sir Ambrose Forth (died 1610) judge of the Irish Court of Admiralty. He did not much enjoy living in Cabra, judging by his letters complaining about his "poor little farm house" there.

The noted mathematician, William Rowan Hamilton, who freed algebra from the commutative postulate of multiplication (that the order or sequence of factors does not determine the result), is a commemorated by a plaque at Broom Bridge.

References

External links

 Cabra history 

Towns and villages in Dublin (city)
Civil parishes of the barony of Castleknock